Francesco Nerli may refer to:

Francesco Nerli (iuniore) (1636–1708), Roman Catholic cardinal
Francesco Nerli (seniore) (1594–1670), Roman Catholic cardinal